Clouds and the Earth's Radiant Energy System (CERES) is  NASA climatological experiment from Earth orbit. The CERES are scientific satellite instruments, part of the  NASA's Earth Observing System (EOS), designed to measure both solar-reflected and Earth-emitted radiation from the top of the atmosphere (TOA) to the Earth's surface. Cloud properties are determined using simultaneous measurements by other EOS instruments such as the Moderate Resolution Imaging Spectroradiometer (MODIS). Results from the CERES and other NASA missions,  such as the Earth Radiation Budget Experiment (ERBE), could enable nearer to real-time tracking of Earth's energy imbalance and better understanding of the role of clouds in global climate change.

Scientific goals

CERES experiment has four main objectives:

 Continuation of the ERBE record of radiative fluxes at the top of the atmosphere (TOA) for climate change analysis.
 Doubling the accuracy of estimates of radiative fluxes at TOA and the Earth's surface.
 Provide the first long-term global estimates of the radiative fluxes within the Earth's atmosphere.
 Provide cloud property estimates that are consistent with the radiative fluxes from surface to TOA.

Each CERES instrument is a radiometer which has three channels – a shortwave (SW) channel to measure reflected sunlight in 0.2–5 µm region, a channel to measure Earth-emitted thermal radiation in the 8–12 µm "window" or "WN" region, and a Total channel to measure entire spectrum of outgoing Earth's radiation (>0.2 µm).  The CERES instrument was based on the successful Earth Radiation Budget Experiment which used three satellites to provide global energy budget measurements from 1984 to 1993.

Missions

First launch
The first CERES instrument Proto-Flight Module (PFM) was launched aboard the NASA Tropical Rainfall Measuring Mission (TRMM) in November 1997 from Japan. However, this instrument failed to operate after 8 months due to an on-board circuit failure.

CERES on the EOS and JPSS mission satellites
An additional six CERES instruments were launched on the Earth Observing System and the Joint Polar Satellite System. The Terra satellite, launched in December 1999, carried two (Flight Module 1 (FM1) and FM2) and the Aqua satellite, launched in May 2002, carried two more (FM3 and FM4). A fifth instrument (FM5) was launched on the Suomi NPP satellite in October 2011 and a sixth (FM6)  on NOAA-20 in November 2017. With the failure of the PFM on TRMM and the 2005 loss of the SW channel of FM4 on Aqua, there are five of the CERES Flight Modules that are fully operational as of 2017.

Radiation Budget Instruments
The measurements of the CERES instruments was to be furthered by the Radiation Budget Instrument (RBI) to be launched on Joint Polar Satellite System-2 (JPSS-2) in 2021, JPSS-3 in 2026, and JPSS-4 in 2031. The project was cancelled on January 26, 2018; NASA cited technical, cost, and schedule issues and the impact of anticipated RBI cost growth on other programs.

Operating modes

CERES operates in three scanning modes: across the satellite ground track (cross-track), along the direction of the satellite ground track (along-track), and in a Rotating Azimuth Plane (RAP). In RAP mode, the radiometers scan in elevation as they rotate in azimuth, thus acquiring radiance measurement from a wide range of viewing angles. Until February 2005, on Terra and Aqua satellites one of CERES instruments scanned in cross-track mode while the other was in RAP or along-track mode. The instrument operating in RAP scanning mode took two days of along-track data every month. However the multi-angular CERES data allowed to derive new models which account for anisotropy of the viewed scene, and allow TOA radiative flux retrieval with enhanced precision.

Calibration methods

Ground absolute calibration

For a climate data record (CDR) mission like CERES, accuracy is of high importance and achieved for pure infrared nighttime measurements by use of a ground laboratory SI traceable blackbody to determine total and WN channel radiometric gains. This however was not the case for CERES solar channels such as SW and solar portion of the Total telescope, which have no direct un-broken chain to SI traceability. This is because CERES solar responses were measured on ground using lamps whose output energy were estimated by a cryo-cavity reference detector, which used a silver Cassegrain telescope identical to CERES devices to match the satellite instrument field of view. The reflectivity of this telescope built and used since the mid-1990s was never actually measured, estimated only based on witness samples (see slide 9 of Priestley et al. (2014)). Such difficulties in ground calibration, combined with suspected on-ground contamination events have resulted in the need to make unexplained ground to flight changes in SW detector gains as big as 8%, simply to make the ERB data seem somewhat reasonable to climate science (note that CERES currently claims a one sigma SW absolute accuracy of 0.9%).

In-flight calibration

CERES spatial resolution at nadir view (equivalent diameter of the footprint) is 10 km for CERES on TRMM, and 20 km for CERES on Terra and Aqua satellites. Perhaps of greater importance for missions such as CERES is calibration stability, or the ability to track and partition instrumental changes from Earth data so it tracks true climate change with confidence. CERES onboard calibration sources intended to achieve this for channels measuring reflected sunlight include solar diffusers and tungsten lamps. However the lamps have very little output in the important ultraviolet wavelength region where degradation is greatest and they have been seen to drift in energy by over 1.4% in ground tests, without a capability to monitor them on-orbit (Priestley et al. (2001)). The solar diffusers have also degraded greatly in orbit such that they have been declared unusable by Priestley et al. (2011). A pair of black body cavities that can be controlled at different temperatures are used for the Total and WN channels, but these have not been proved stable to better than 0.5%/decade.  Cold space observations and internal calibration are performed during normal Earth scans.

Intercalibration
Data is compared between CERES instruments on different mission satellites,  as well as compared to scan reference data from accompanying spectroradiometers (e.g. MODIS on Aqua).   The planned CLARREO Pathfinder mission aims to provide a state-of-the-art reference standard for several existing EOS instruments including CERES.

A study of annual changes to Earth's energy imbalance (EEI) spanning 2005-2019 showed good agreement between the CERES observation and EEI inferred from in-situ measurements of ocean heat uptake by the Argo float network.

See also

Earth's energy budget
Geostationary Earth Radiation Budget
Radiometry
Remote sensing

References

External links
NASA CERES official site
CERES Data Products
Terra satellite, NASA EOS flagship
Aqua satellite, NASA EOS
VISIBLE EARTH, catalog of CERES images

NASA programs
Articles containing video clips
Atmospheric sounding satellite sensors